Carly Melin (born August 13, 1985) is a Minnesota politician and former member of the Minnesota House of Representatives. A member of the Minnesota Democratic–Farmer–Labor Party (DFL), she represented District 6A, which included portions of the Iron Range in Itasca and St. Louis counties in northeastern Minnesota. In February 2018, Melin became executive director of the Minnesota State Building and Construction Trades Council, a labor group representing 70,000 union members. On January 31, 2019, Attorney General Keith Ellison appointed Melin as government affairs director for his office.

Early life, education, and career
Melin attended Hibbing High School in Hibbing, Minnesota. She received a B.S. in political science magna cum laude from Bemidji State University and a J.D. from Hamline University School of Law in Saint Paul, Minnesota. After graduating, she returned to the Iron Range to practice law, accepting a position with the Minnesota State Judiciary.

Minnesota House of Representatives
Melin won a special election held on February 15, 2011, to fill the vacancy that arose after Governor Mark Dayton appointed Representative Tony Sertich commissioner of the Iron Range Resources and Rehabilitation Board. She was reelected in 2012 and 2014, but did not seek reelection in 2016, citing a desire to spend more time raising her two sons.

Personal life
Melin married her high school sweetheart Zeb Norenberg on June 8, 2013. They have two sons. Melin and Norenberg divorced in 2017. In July 2018, Melin and former state representative Joe Radinovich announced their engagement.

References

External links

 Carly Melin on Twitter

1985 births
Living people
People from Hibbing, Minnesota
Democratic Party members of the Minnesota House of Representatives
Women state legislators in Minnesota
Hamline University School of Law alumni
21st-century American politicians
21st-century American women politicians
Hibbing High School alumni